Thomas Fowler (May 18, 1924 – June 14, 1994) was a Canadian professional ice hockey centre who played 24 games in the National Hockey League with the Chicago Black Hawks during the 1946–47 season. The rest of his career, which lasted from 1944 to 1952, was spent in various minor leagues. He was born in Winnipeg, Manitoba.

Career statistics

Regular season and playoffs

Awards and achievements
PCHL Southern First All-Star Team (1949)
PCHL Southern Division MVP (1949)
SSHL First All-Star Team (1953)

External links
 

1924 births
1994 deaths
Canadian ice hockey centres
Chicago Blackhawks players
Fort Worth Rangers players
Kansas City Pla-Mors players
Los Angeles Monarchs players
Oakland Oaks (PCHL) players
Saskatoon Quakers players
Ice hockey people from Winnipeg
Tulsa Oilers (USHL) players
Winnipeg Monarchs players